Kangema is a settlement in Muranga County, Kenya. It is the birthplace of James Mwangi, the Group Managing Director and Group Chief Executive Officer of the Equity Group Holdings Limited, the banking conglomerate with the largest customer base on the African continent, in excess of 8 million as of 2014.

Location
The coordinates of Kangema are:0°41'08.0"S, 36°57'54.0"E (Latitude:-0.685556; Latitude:36.965000).

Points of interest
Equity Bank Kenya maintains a branch in Kangema, so does Kenya Commercial Bank and Family Bank. In Kenya's colonial history, Kangema is famed for the colonial District Commissioner (DC) called Whitney Whittaker (Waitina) who cut the tails of indigenous dogs and castrated Kikuyu men in his jurisdiction.

See also
 Wealthy Kenyans
 Aberdare Range
 Mwangi

References

External links
  Police In Kangema have Intercepted Seven Sacks of Bhang Worth 1 Million Shillings

Murang'a County
Populated places in Central Province (Kenya)